Spoladea mimetica is a moth in the family Crambidae, found in New Guinea. It was described by Eugene G. Munroe in 1974.

References

Spilomelinae
Endemic fauna of New Guinea
Moths described in 1974
Moths of New Guinea
Taxa named by Eugene G. Munroe